Stellerite is a rare mineral discovered by and named after Georg Wilhelm Steller, a German explorer and zoologist. The mineral has a general formula of Ca[Al2Si7O18]·7H2O. Like most rare minerals, there are few commercial uses for stellerite. Mineral collectors are lucky to find it in good enough crystal form. Zeolites, including stellerite, have been studied using a dehydration process to gauge the potential use of their phases as molecular sieves, sorbents, and catalysts.

Crystal habit 
Stellerite is part of the orthorhombic crystal system which means it has three axes of unequal length that intersect at 90° angles. Its crystal class is rhombic-dipyramidal which means it has three perpendicular two-fold rotational axes with perpendicular mirror planes. Stilbite, another zeolite, is very similar to stellerite in both chemical composition and physical appearance. Stellerite is more commonly found in rounded radiating clusters or as single crystals and appears more transparent than stilbite does.

Optical properties 
Stellerite is an anisotropic mineral, meaning that it has different properties in different directions-such as indices of refraction-when light passes through it. A refractive index (n) measures the speed of light in a substance—or in the case of mineralogy—in a mineral. It is expressed as a ratio of the speed of light in vacuum to that in a mineral. Stellerite has three indices of refraction because it is a biaxial mineral.

Occurrence 
Stellerite lines cavities and fracture surfaces in volcanic rocks altered by hydrothermal solutions. Great examples of Stellerite are on Copper Island, Commander Islands (also discovered by Georg Steller), Bering Sea and at Klichka, Chita region, Siberia, Russia. In the United States, it is located at Ritter Hot Springs, Grant County, Oregon; on Hook Mountain, Rockland County, New York; and at Fanwood, Union County, New Jersey. Large crystals have been found in Australia around Gunnedah, New South Wales, and at Harcourt, Dookie, and Corop, Victoria.

References

Aluminium minerals
Calcium minerals
Tectosilicates
Zeolites
Orthorhombic minerals
Minerals in space group 69